The 2021 Major Arena Soccer League 2 season is the fourth season for the league also known as M2. The regular season started on January 22, 2021, and ended on July 11, 2021, due to the COVID-19 pandemic.

The Major Arena Soccer League signed an agreement with Arena Soccer Group, LLC (ASG) to take over the management of M2 on October 24, 2019.

Changes from 2019-20
Expansion
Cleveland Crunch
Omaha Kings

Returned
Chicago Mustangs

Provisional Schedule
Muskegon Risers

Left or not competing due to COVID-19
Chihuahua Savage
Wichita Falls Flyers FC
Austin Power FC
New Mexico Runners
Colorado Rumble

Standings
As of July 12, 2021

(Bold) Division Winner

Invitationals
The Winners of 3 Invitational Tournaments will provide 3 of the 4 playoff spots, while the best remaining overall team in the standings will provide the final spot. Matches played in these tournaments also count towards the regular season standings.  

(Bold) Division Winner

Playoffs

The MASL 2 Playoffs were played in Wichita, KS on July 17–18, 2021.  

'
July 17, 2021  Semifinals 
 3:00 pm - Cleveland Crunch 12, FC Amarillo Bombers 6
 7:00 pm - Wichita Wings 7, Chicago Mustangs 1

July 18, 2021  Championship Final 
 5:00 pm - Cleveland Crunch 11, Wichita Wings 6

References

External links
 MASL2 official website

 
Major Arena Soccer League